Theclopsis  demea is a Neotropical butterfly in the family Lycaenidae. It is found in Nicaragua and Panama.

References

Theclinae